Frith Lake is lake in geographic Churchill Township the Unorganized North Part of Sudbury District in northeastern Ontario, Canada. The lake is in the Saint Lawrence River drainage basin.

Hydrology
The nearest community is Shining Tree, on Ontario Highway 560,  to the south.

There is one unnamed inflow, arriving at the east from Speed Lake. The primary outflow is an unnamed creek at the north that flows north to West Shining Tree Lake, and then via West Shining Tree Creek, the West Montreal River, the Montreal River and the Ottawa River to the Saint Lawrence River.

References

Lakes of Sudbury District